Degree of endangerment is an evaluation assigned by UNESCO  to the languages in the Atlas of the World's Languages in Danger. Evaluation is given according to nine criteria, the most important of which is the criterion of language transmission between generations.

Degree of endangerment

References 

Language
Sociolinguistics
Linguistic rights